Armin Tanković (born 22 March 1990) is a Bosnian footballer who plays as a central midfielder for Assyriska FF.

His cousin, Muamer, is also a football player who plays for the Swedish top tier team Hammarby IF.

References

External links

1990 births
Living people
Swedish footballers
Bosnia and Herzegovina emigrants to Sweden
Association football midfielders
IF Sylvia players
IFK Norrköping players
Superettan players
Allsvenskan players
IK Sirius Fotboll players
Dalkurd FF players
Karlstad BK players
Assyriska FF players